Harald Bonimeier (born 6 September 1990) is a German footballer who plays as a midfielder for SV Erlbach.

Career
Bonimeier made his professional debut for Wacker Burghausen in the 3. Liga on 30 October 2010, coming on as a substitute in the 90+1st minute for Christian Holzer in the 4–3 home win against Kickers Offenbach.

Personal life
Bonimeier's older brother, Roland, is a retired professional footballer who also played for Wacker Burghausen.

References

External links
 
 
 SV Erlbach statistics at BFV.de 

1990 births
Living people
People from Burghausen, Altötting
Sportspeople from Upper Bavaria
Footballers from Bavaria
German footballers
Association football midfielders
SV Wacker Burghausen players
3. Liga players
Regionalliga players
TSV Buchbach players